Reddick is a village in Kankakee County, Illinois, United States. A small portion of the village extends into Livingston County. The population was 163 at the 2010 census, down from 219 at the 2000 census.

The Kankakee County portion of Reddick is included in the Kankakee-Bradley, Illinois Metropolitan Statistical Area, while the small Livingston County portion is part of the Pontiac Micropolitan Statistical Area.

As of 1988, children living in the village and surrounding area attend schools in Herscher School District #2.

Geography
Reddick is located in western Kankakee County at  (41.097423, -88.248843) and extends west into northeastern Livingston County.

The soil of the land in and around Reddick consists of a heavy black loam with a clay sub-soil suitable for the growing of corn, oats, clover, and timothy hay. In 1865, farmland could be purchased for $2.00 an acre; by 1904, farm land was worth $110.00 to $200.00 per acre.

Demographics

As of the census of 2000, there were 219 people, 80 households, and 60 families residing in the village. The racial makeup of the village was 97.26% White, 0.46% from other races, and 2.28% from two or more races. Hispanic or Latino of any race were 0.46% of the population.

There were 80 households, out of which 33.8% had children under the age of 18 living with them, 63.8% were married couples living together, 10.0% had a female householder with no husband present, and 25.0% were non-families. 22.5% of all households were made up of individuals, and 16.3% had someone living alone who was 65 years of age or older. The average household size was 2.74 and the average family size was 3.20.

In the village, the population was spread out, with 26.5% under the age of 18, 9.6% from 18 to 24, 26.5% from 25 to 44, 21.9% from 45 to 64, and 15.5% who were 65 years of age or older. The median age was 37 years. For every 100 females, there were 88.8 males. For every 100 females age 18 and over, there were 87.2 males.

The median income for a household in the village was $61,250, and the median income for a family was $66,250. Males had a median income of $37,917 versus $28,056 for females. The per capita income for the village was $21,207. About 14.7% of families and 8.7% of the population were below the poverty line, including 17.9% of those under the age of eighteen and 10.3% of those 65 or over.

History
The village of Reddick was platted in 1880 and incorporated in 1890 with a population of 400. By 1895, business enterprises included a tile factory, two grain elevators, a millinery and dressmaker shop, a general store, a livery stable, two hotels, lumber and coal businesses, a barber shop, blacksmith, and others. All of the land around Reddick was plotted into sections, divided into quarter sections equaling  each, and usually tilled by one family.

Two railroads were constructed about 1879, forming an intersection where Reddick now stands. The Wabash Railroad went from Chicago to St. Louis. The second railroad ran east and west and was called the "Three I" or Illinois, Indiana, and Iowa Railroad, later the New York Central. At this railroad intersection, a business center for the rich agricultural community was developed. Because the portion of land south of the crosstracks seemed to be best due to drainage, the new settlers began building there. This placed Reddick in Norton Township in Kankakee County.

Coal was discovered under the land north of Reddick in the 1860s. Railroad spurs were built around 1888 to coal mine towns near Reddick:  Clarke City, Oklahoma, Tracy, and Cardiff, but by 1918, all four were ghost towns. Strip mining was performed north of Reddick between 1950 and 1974. The first Reddick Electric Plant was opened in 1906. The General Telephone Company, originally organized as a farmer's cooperative, still required the services of an operator to switch calls until 1964.

The first school in the village was constructed in 1902 and consisted of two rooms and a library, and employed two teachers. By 1906, the library was converted into another classroom, a third teacher was hired, and a two-year high school was established. In 1915, a four-year high school course was added. In 1919 Reddick Community High School was organized, and a new building was constructed in 1921. The grade school was remodeled in 1949 and 1974, but when Reddick joined the Herscher School District in 1988, the high school was torn down. In the 2000s and 2010s grades 4 and 5 attended Reddick Grade School. In 2014, Herscher Community School District decided they no longer needed the school and sold it to the Reddick Fire Department. All children in the Reddick area now attend Bonfield, Limestone, or Herscher schools in the #2 school district. Prior to 1988, children attended the Reddick School District, known better as "RUCE", an acronym that consisted of the villages that were part of the school district (Reddick, Union Hill, Campus, and Essex). The Reddick High School Bulldogs, whose colors were orange and black, were known for their excellence in American football.

In the 1980s, Highway 17, which led traffic through Reddick, was rerouted to bypass the village. The railroad tracks were removed and made into a bike trail in the early 1990s.

References

Villages in Kankakee County, Illinois
Villages in Livingston County, Illinois
Villages in Illinois
Populated places established in 1880
1880 establishments in Illinois